The 2017 European Canoe Slalom Championships took place in Tacen, Slovenia under the auspices of the European Canoe Association (ECA). It was the 18th edition of the competition and Tacen hosted the event for the second time after previously hosting it in 2005. The events took place at the Tacen Whitewater Course from 31 May to 4 June 2017.

Medal summary

Men's results

Canoe

Kayak

Women's results

Canoe

Kayak

Medal table

References

External links 
 Slalom Tacen - 2017 ECA Canoe Slalom European Championships
 European Canoe Association

European Canoe Slalom Championships
International sports competitions hosted by Slovenia
Sports competitions in Ljubljana
European Canoe Slalom Championships
Canoe Slalom
European Canoe Slalom Championships
European Canoe Slalom Championships
European Canoe Slalom Championships